Tvorchi (stylised in all caps) are a Ukrainian electronic music duo from Ternopil, formed in 2018 by producer Andrii Hutsuliak and vocalist Jimoh Augustus Kehinde (alias Jeffery Kenny). They have released four studio albums: The Parts (2018), Disco Lights (2019), 13 Waves (2020) and Road (2020). They are set to represent Ukraine in the Eurovision Song Contest 2023 with the song "Heart of Steel".

History 

Andrii Viktorovych Hutsuliak (born 21 February 1996 in Vilkhovets, Chortkiv Raion) and Jimoh Augustus Kehinde (born 30 September 1997 in Nigeria) met while they were students at the Faculty of Pharmacy of Ternopil National Medical University. On 30 May 2017, the duo released their first single, "Slow". On 4 September, their second single "You" was released.

On 2 February 2018, Tvorchi released their debut album, The Parts. On 20 September 2018, the duo released a video for the song "Molodist". On 14 February 2019, the second album named Disco Lights was released. On 21 February, the duo released a video for the song "Believe". According to the duo, the shooting budget was $100. Within a few days, the video garnered 400,000 views on YouTube, and the song ranked 9th in Google Play charts in Ukraine.

In the summer of that year, the duo performed at music festivals Faine Misto (Ternopil), Atlas Weekend (Kyiv) and Ukrainian Song Project (Lviv). On 9 September, the duo released the single "Ne tantsiuiu". In February 2020, Tvorchi entered Vidbir with the song "Bonfire", placing fourth in the final.

The music video for the song "Mova tila" from the second studio album Disco Lights premiered on 7 May on the duo's YouTube channel and on the M1 television show Premier. The video, directed by Andrii Lahutin, was shot in the fall of 2019 in Kyiv. On 25 September 2020, the music video for the lead single from the album 13 Waves, "Living My Life", was released.

In September 2020, Tvorchi released their third album, 13 Waves, which was recorded remotely because of the COVID-19 pandemic. The album was played more than two million times on music platforms in the first week since its release. On 19 December 2020, the duo won the online music award "Culture Ukraine" in two categories: 'Best New Artist', and 'Best English-language single' for "Bonfire". The duo was also nominated for the YUNA 2021 Music Awards in four categories, including 'Album of the Year'. 

In December 2022, they entered Vidbir 2023 and won the competition with the song "Heart of Steel", coming second in the jury vote and first in the public vote, and will thus represent Ukraine in the Eurovision Song Contest 2023.

Music videos

References

External links 

 
 
 
 

Eurovision Song Contest entrants of 2023
Eurovision Song Contest entrants for Ukraine
Ukrainian pop music groups
Musical groups established in 2018
Musical groups from Ternopil
2018 establishments in Ukraine